Peter the Athonite (d. before 883) is reputed to have been the first hermit to settle upon the Mount Athos.

Peter is known to history primarily through unattributable legend. It is recorded that Peter was once a soldier who, through the miraculous aid of St. Nicholas and St. Simeon the Righteous, was freed from a Muslim military prison in Syria. From prison St. Peter traveled to New Rome to fulfill a promise to God that he would take the monastic habit.  It is held that Peter received his habit from the Pope himself who also formed the saint in monastic discipline. Receiving a vision of the Blessed Virgin and Theotokos Mary, Peter traveled to Mt. Athos and lived as an ascetic in a cave at Mount Athos for some fifty years. His relics were taken to the Monastery of Clement, a formerly existing monastery that is now occupied by the Monastery of Iviron.

A hagiography devoted to Saint Peter the Athonite was written at Hilandar by Genadius the Athonite.

Saint Peter of Mount Athos is commemorated on 12 June by the Eastern Orthodox, Eastern Catholic and Roman Catholic Churches.

See also

Silouan the Athonite

References

Sources
 
 Venerable Peter of Mt. Athos. OCA - Feasts and Saints.
 St. Peter of Mount Athos. Catholic Online.

Athonite Fathers
Christian monasticism
Hermits
Saints of medieval Greece
9th-century Christian saints
9th-century Byzantine people
9th-century deaths